Crematogaster biroi is a species of ant in tribe Crematogastrini. It was described by Mayr in 1897.

References

biroi
Insects described in 1897